Ulmus 'Urban' is an American hybrid elm cultivar selected from the progeny of a controlled crossing of the Siberian Elm Ulmus pumila (female parent) with the Dutch clone '148' (U. × hollandica 'Vegeta' × U. minor '28') in 1958 by Toru Arisumi of the USDA at Columbus, Ohio. Clone '148' had been sent to the US from the Netherlands in 1952 by Johanna Went, leader of the elm research team at the Willie Commelin Scholten Phytopathology Laboratory in Baarn.

Description
'Urban' is considered a poor ornamental, the tree possessed of stiff branching and amorphous form. The lanceolate to obovate leaves are < 9 cm long × < 4 cm broad, smooth with light venation on the upper surface, on 6 mm petioles and clustered on short, very thin, wingless branchlets.

Pests and diseases
'Urban' has a moderate resistance to Dutch elm disease; in trials conducted by the Istituto per la Protezione delle Piante, Florence, it suffered 49.5% defoliation and 36.5% dieback when inoculated with spores of the causal fungus, compared with 2.8% and 1.2% resp. for 'Sapporo Autumn Gold'.
Foliage was adjudged "resistant" to Black Spot by the Plant Diagnostic Clinic of the University of Missouri .
However, foliage can be heavily to severely damaged by the Elm Leaf Beetle Xanthogaleruca luteola

Cultivation
All these trees initially grew strongly on the heavy clay loam, attaining > 8 m in height in seven years. However, at this age, one died of Dutch Elm Disease whilst four others exhibited weakness at the root and fell in gales in later years. Only one tree remains (the TROBI champion); 12 m high, 26 cm d.b.h. in 1997, and that in poor health in 2008. However, the trees are survived by numerous root suckers.

Other plantings in Europe are few and far between; several were established in the port area of Amsterdam . The tree also featured in trials , in
Canberra, Australia, started in 1988 but "has not shown promise in that environment".

Hybrid cultivars
'Urban' was crossed with the Wilson's Elm (now treated as Japanese Elm U. davidiana var. japonica) cultivar 'Prospector' to create the cultivar 'Patriot'.

Synonymy
'Delaware No. 1': USDA, before commercial release as 'Urban'.
'Ohio Hybrid':

Accessions
North America
Chicago Botanic Garden, US. 1 tree, in West Collections Area, listed as U. × hollandica 'Urban'.
Morton Arboretum, US. Acc. no. 66–70
Europe
Grange Farm Arboretum , Lincolnshire, UK. Acc. no. 824.
Wijdemeren City Council, Netherlands. Elm collection, used in elm trials Ankeveen 2014.

Nurseries
North America
Lake County Nursery , Perry, Ohio, US.
Sun Valley Garden Centre , Eden Prairie, Minnesota, US.

References

Hybrid elm cultivar
Ulmus articles with images
Ulmus